Qeshlaq-e Hajji Hasan (also Romanized as Qeshlāq-e Ḩājjī Ḩasan) is a village in Qeshlaq-e Shomali Rural District, in the Central District of Parsabad County, Ardabil Province, Iran. At the 2006 census, its population was 94, in 21 families.

References 

Towns and villages in Parsabad County